The 2nd millennium BC spanned the years 2000 BC to 1001 BC. 
In the Ancient Near East, it marks the transition from the Middle to the Late Bronze Age.
The Ancient Near Eastern cultures are well within the historical era:
The first half of the millennium is  dominated by the Middle Kingdom of Egypt and Babylonia. The alphabet develops. 
At the center of the millennium, a new order emerges with Mycenaean Greek dominance of the Aegean and the rise of the Hittite Empire. The end of the millennium sees the Bronze Age collapse and the transition to the Iron Age.

Other regions of the world are still in the prehistoric period. In Europe, the Beaker culture introduces the Bronze Age, presumably associated with Indo-European expansion.  The Indo-Iranian expansion reaches  the Iranian plateau and onto the Indian subcontinent (Vedic India), propagating the use of the chariot. Mesoamerica enters the Pre-Classic (Olmec) period. North America is in the late Archaic stage. In Maritime Southeast Asia, the Austronesian expansion reaches Micronesia. In Sub-Saharan Africa, the Bantu expansion begins.

World population rose steadily, possibly  surpassing the 100 million mark for the first time.

The world in the 2nd millennium BC

History

See the article on chronology of the ancient Near East for a discussion regarding the accuracy and resolution of dates for events of the 2nd millennium BC in the Near East.

Middle Bronze Age
Spending much of their energies in trying to recuperate from the chaotic situation that existed at the turn of the millennium, the most powerful civilizations of the time, Egypt and Mesopotamia, turned their attention to more modest goals. The Pharaohs of the Middle Kingdom of Egypt and their contemporary Kings of Babylon, of Amorite origin, brought good governance without much tyranny, and favoured elegant art and architecture. Farther east, the Indus Valley civilization was in a period of decline, possibly as a result of intense, ruinous flooding.

Egypt and Babylonia's military tactics were still based on foot soldiers transporting their equipment on donkeys. Combined with a weak economy and difficulty in maintaining order, this was a fragile situation that crumbled under the pressure of external forces they could not oppose.

Unrest of the 16th century 
About a century before the middle of the millennium, bands of Indo-European invaders came from the Central Asian plains and swept through Western Asia and Northeast Africa. They were riding fast two-wheeled chariots powered by horses, a system of weaponry developed earlier in the context of plains warfare. This tool of war was unknown among the classical civilizations. Egypt and Babylonia's foot soldiers were unable to defend against the invaders: in 1630 BC, the Hyksos swept into the Nile Delta, and in 1595 BC, the Hittites swept into Mesopotamia.

Late Bronze Age
The people in place were quick to adapt to the new tactics, and a new international situation resulted from the change. Though during most of the second half of the 2nd millennium BC several regional powers competed relentlessly for hegemony, many developments occurred: there was new emphasis on grandiose architecture, new clothing fashions, vivid diplomatic correspondence on clay tablets, renewed economic exchanges, and the New Kingdom of Egypt played the role of the main superpower. Among the great states of the time, only Babylon refrained from taking part in battles, mainly due to its new position as the world's religious and intellectual capital.

The Bronze Age civilization at its final period of time, displayed all its characteristic social traits: low level of urbanization, small cities centered on temples or royal palaces, strict separation of classes between an illiterate mass of peasants and craftsmen, and a powerful military elite, knowledge of writing and education reserved to a tiny minority of scribes, and pronounced aristocratic life.

Near the end of the 2nd millennium BC, new waves of barbarians, this time riding on horseback, wholly destroyed the Bronze Age world, and were to be followed by waves of social changes that marked the beginning of different times. Also contributing to the changes were the Sea Peoples, ship-faring raiders of the Mediterranean.

Empires and dynasties 

Ancient Near East
 Middle Kingdom of Egypt
 New Kingdom of Egypt
Old Assyrian Empire
Middle Assyrian Empire
 Elam
 Hittites Old Kingdom in Anatolia
Vedic India
 Kuru Kingdom
Bronze Age China
 Shang Dynasty
 Zhou Dynasty

Prehistoric cultures

Europe

Europe is still entirely within the prehistoric era;  much of Europe enters the Bronze Age early in the 2nd millennium.
 Aegean civilization
 Cycladic culture
 Helladic period
 Minoan civilization
 Mycenaean Greece 
 Beaker culture
 Terramare culture
 Tumulus culture
 Unetice culture
 Urnfield culture

Central Asia
 Andronovo culture
 Oxus civilization

East Asia

 Erlitou culture
 Wucheng culture

South Asia 
Ahar–Banas culture
Cemetery H culture
Indus valley civilization
Jorwe culture
Malwa culture
Ochre Coloured Pottery culture

Americas
 Olmec

Sub-Saharan Africa
The desiccation of the Sahara is complete. Neolithisation of Sub-Saharan Africa is initiated via expansion from the dried Sahara, reaching West and East Africa. Later in the 2nd millennium, pastoralism and iron metallurgy spread to Central Africa via the Bantu migration. 
 Kerma culture
 Savanna Pastoral Neolithic
 Nok culture

Events 

 2000 BC – Seima-Turbino Phenomenon.
 1700–1300 BC – Palace complex in Knossos, Crete, was built.
 1700 BC earthquake damages palaces at Knossos and Phaistos.
 1627 BC – Minoan eruption.
 1600 BC–1360 BC – Egyptian domination over Canaan and Syria.
 1575 BC – Nubian Kerma sacks Egypt.
 1500 BC – Volcanic eruption at Thera.
 1500 BC – Meteorite impact that formed the Kaali crater in Estonia.
 1500 BC – Bantu expansion across central, eastern and southern Africa.
1520 BC – Egypt conquers Nubia.
1478 BC – Battle of Megiddo between Ancient Egyptians and the Canaanites.
1269 BC – Ramses II and Hattusilis III sign peace treaty.
1274 BC – Battle of Kadesh between Ancient Egyptians and Hittites.
 1250 BC – destruction of Troy VII.
1045 BC – Zhou Dynasty founded in China.

Inventions, discoveries, introductions

Chinese Oracle bone script.
Tumble polishing: Indians innvoted polishing method in the 10th century BC.
Diamond drills: in the 12th century BC or 7th century BC, Indians not only innovated use of diamond tipped drills but also invented double diamond tipped drills for bead manufacturing.
Phoenician alphabet.
 Nebra sky disk, oldest known visual representation of the cosmos.
 Discovery of new iron smelting and smithing techniques.
 Spoke-wheeled chariots.

Languages

In the history of the Egyptian language, the early 2nd millennium saw a transition from Old Egyptian to Middle Egyptian. As the most used written form of the Ancient Egyptian language, it is frequently (incorrectly) referred to simply as "Hieroglyphics".

The earliest attested Indo-European language, the Hittite language, first appears in cuneiform in the 16th century BC (Anitta text), before disappearing from records in the 13th century BC. Hittite is the best known and the most studied language of the extinct Anatolian branch of Indo-European languages.

The first Northwest Semitic language, Ugaritic, is attested in the 14th century BC. The first fully phonemic script Proto-Canaanite developed from Egyptian hieroglyphs, becoming the Phoenician alphabet by 1200 BC. The Phoenician alphabet was spread throughout the Mediterranean by Phoenician maritime traders and became one of the most widely used writing systems in the world, and the parent of virtually all alphabetic writing systems. The Phoenician language is also the first Canaanite language, the Northwest Semitic languages spoken by the ancient peoples of the Canaan region: the Israelites, Phoenicians, Amorites, Ammonites, Moabites and Edomites.

Mycenaean Greek, the most ancient attested form of the Greek language, was used on the Greek mainland, Crete and Cyprus in the Mycenaean period.

Centuries and Decades

References

See also

 
-98